In professional wrestling, a weight class is a standardized weight range for the wrestlers. The top class in almost every promotion is heavyweight, but super heavyweights exist. Weight class matches in modern-day American professional wrestling are rare, but weight class championships still exist. However, Japanese professional wrestling, Mexican wrestling and British wrestling use the weight classes more seriously.

Australia

Australian professional wrestling championships determined by weight class

United States 
WWE, the largest professional wrestling promotion both nationally and internationally, has a reserved championship exclusively for wrestlers under the "Cruiserweight" category. Historically, WWE has had a number of championships that were only competed by lighter wrestlers such as the WWE Light Heavyweight Championship which became defunct in 2001. Conversely, WWE's so-called "Heavyweight" championships are not exclusive to heavyweight performers (240 lbs and above), as they have been won by comparatively smaller wrestlers such as Rey Mysterio and AJ Styles.

While some of the smaller, independent wrestling promotions use weight classes, most of the larger promotions do not. Even if weight classes are used, they are usually not enforced due to the scripted nature of professional wrestling. In March 2013, Total Nonstop Action Wrestling (TNA) imposed a 230 lb (104 kg) weight limit for wrestlers competing in the X Division for the TNA X Division Championship. In October 2013, however, TNA wrestler Samoa Joe, billed at 280 lb (127 kg), competed in an X Division Championship bout at TNA's Bound for Glory pay-per-view. Rather, it's more common for wrestling promotions to create a secondary championship to be competed for by smaller wrestlers. This championship, depending upon the promotion, is usually named Cruiserweight, Light Heavyweight or Junior Heavyweight. In some sports, most notably boxing since it has a large number of weight classes, these three names represent different separate weight classes. In professional wrestling the upper weight limit of these championships varied and are often not strictly enforced, depending upon the desires of company management, but usually ranged from a maximum of 215 pounds to 230 pounds depending upon the promotion. Throughout the years, practically all of such championships have been retired due to the wrestling promotion closing down or losing interest. The oldest of these championships still active in the United States is the NWA World Junior Heavyweight Championship. Created in 1945, the title is also recognized and frequently defended in other promotions outside of the United States.

US pro wrestling championships determined by weight class

Former NWA Weight Classes 
The only active National Wrestling Alliance championship formerly in a specified weight division is the NWA World Heavyweight Championship (July 14, 1948 – present). Previously for >225 lbs., the championship is open to any weight class.

Mexico 
No other professional wrestling promotions have made such an extensive use of weight classes as some located in Mexico. The lucha libre style is highly prominent in Mexico and makes extensive use of high spots and a fast, sometimes frantic, pace that suits physically smaller wrestlers. As a result, most of the top professional wrestling stars in Mexico are lighter than those in many American promotions. Whereas the few American promotions and governing bodies, such as the National Wrestling Alliance, have what would be termed a Cruiserweight, Light Heavyweight or Junior Heavyweight division, several Mexican wrestling promotions have multiple weight classes.

Mexican pro wrestling championships determined by weight class

Japan 
As with Mexico, non-heavyweight wrestling championships have risen to prominence in a number of Japanese wrestling promotions. Unlike Mexico, however, and more in line with most promotions in the United States, most Japanese wrestling companies generally have a secondary singles and, in some cases, a tag team championship geared to the Cruiserweight/Junior Heavyweight/Light Heavyweight weight division rather than multiple weight divisions.

Japanese pro wrestling championships determined by weight class 
BJW Junior Heavyweight Championship: February 3, 1998 – 2002
BJW Junior Heavyweight Championship: May 7, 2017 – present
GHC Junior Heavyweight Championship: June 24, 2001 – present
GHC Junior Heavyweight Tag Team Championship: July 16, 2003 – present
Independent World Junior Heavyweight Championship: October 28, 1993 – present
Tenryu Project International Junior Heavyweight Championship: March 26, 1995 – present
International Junior Heavyweight Tag Team Championship: February 23, 1996 – present
IWGP Junior Heavyweight Championship: February 6, 1986 – present
IWGP Junior Heavyweight Tag Team Championship: August 8, 1998 – present
NWA International Lightweight Tag Team Championship: December 23, 2003  – present
Zero1 NWA World Junior Heavyweight Championship: September 20, 2011 – present
Osaka Light Heavyweight Championship: July 31, 2022 – present
Tohoku Junior Heavyweight Championship: August 25, 2002 – present
UWA World Light Heavyweight Championship: November 25, 1975 – present
UWA World Middleweight Championship: November 26, 1975 – present
AJPW World Junior Heavyweight Championship: July 31, 1986 – present
Zero1 International Junior Heavyweight Championship: June 29, 2002 – present

United Kingdom 

The 1947 Admiral-Lord Mountevans rules set out seven weight divisions with maximum weight limits and called for champions to be crowned of each limit: Lightweight: 11st, Welterweight 11st 11 lb, Middleweight 12st 8 lb, Heavy Middleweight 13st 5 lb, Light Heavyweight 14st 2 lb, Mid-Heavyweight 14st 13 lb and Heavyweight for all weights upwards of 15st.

An earlier system of weight classes with different levels and more divisions existed under the 1930 All-In rules. Many "American style"/"New School" promotions follow the example of modern US promotions of having a Cruiserweight/Junior Heavyweight/etc division alongside primarily Heavyweight competition.

 British Commonwealth Junior Heavyweight Championship
 British Flyweight Championship 
 British Lightweight Championship 
 British Welterweight Championship 
 British Middleweight Championship 
 British Heavy Middleweight Championship 
 British Light Heavyweight Championship 
 British Mid-Heavyweight Championship 
 European Heavyweight Championship
 European Mid-Heavyweight Championship
 European Junior Heavyweight Championship
 European Cruiserweight Championship
 European Light Heavyweight Championship
 European Middleweight Championship
 European Welterweight Championship
 European Lightweight Championship
 World Lightweight Championship
 World Welterweight Championship
 World Middleweight Championship
 World Heavy Middleweight Championship
 World Light Heavyweight Championship
 World Mid-Heavyweight Championship
 World Heavyweight Championship
ICW Zero-G Championship
RQW Cruiserweight Championship
PWP Catch Division Championship

An exclusion does apply to charity ran organisations whereby, the organisation is not required to have weight divisions and may use the weight, without impersonation, to market their product for the charity and/or cause and nothing further. Organisations of this nature may also have a smaller roster of professional wrestlers to be able to separate weight divisions and therefore, all athletes must sign a contractual disclaimer in order to compete.

Russian Federation

Russian professional wrestling championships determined by weight class 
IWF Lightweight Championship: limited by 187 lbs

See also 
Brazilian Jiu-Jitsu weight classes
Boxing Weight Class
Kickboxing weight classes
Mixed martial arts weight classes
Taekwondo weight classes
Wrestling weight classes

References

External links